Utah Schools for the Deaf and the Blind (USDB) is a state education agency of Utah that educates blind and deaf children. It includes a boarding and day school in Ogden, which has the USDB headquarters, and sites in Salt Lake City and Springville.

Campuses
The Ogden campus has the Kenneth Burdett School for the Deaf and a School for the Blind, with about 50 students total. The USBD main administrative offices are in the Ogden campus. This campus has dormitories; the USDB states they can house "A very limited number of students". In the 1980s, in addition to the boarders at the deaf school, some students stayed with host families.

The Jean Massieu School of the Deaf in Salt Lake City integrated into the USDB after being founded as a charter school in 1999.

The Elizabeth DeLong School of the Springville Campus is in Springville. It construction begin in March 2019 with completion expected for January 2020. Jacoby Architects designed the school, which had a cost of $13 million.

Transportation
In 1997 USDB gave a contract to Wasatch Transportation for school transportation services, leading to a protest from Quality Busing, a company which was not awarded the contract.

References

External links

 Utah Schools for the Deaf and the Blind
 Utah Schools for the Deaf and the Blind Springville School - Architect Magazine 

Schools for the blind in the United States
Schools for the deaf in the United States
Public K-12 schools in the United States
Public elementary schools in Utah
Public middle schools in Utah
Public high schools in Utah
Public boarding schools in the United States
Boarding schools in Utah
Schools in Weber County, Utah